Elmar Maharram oghlu Mammadyarov, born July 2, 1960) is an Azerbaijani diplomat who served as Minister of Foreign Affairs of Azerbaijan between 7 April 2004 and 16 July 2020. Mammadyarov speaks Russian, English, Azerbaijani, and Turkish.

Early life
Mammadyarov was born in Baku, then part of the Azerbaijan SSR, on July 2, 1960. His father, Maharram Mammadyarov, was born in Nakhchivan Autonomous Republic. He studied at the School of International Relations and International Law of the Kiev State University in 1977-1982. He continued his education at the Diplomatic Academy of the MFA of USSR in 1988-1991 and obtained a PhD in History. In 1989-1990, Mammadyarov was appointed as exchange scholar at the Center for Foreign Policy Development of the Brown University.

Political career
Mammadyarov started his diplomatic career in the Ministry of Foreign Affairs of the Azerbaijani SSR in 1982. He served there as second and first secretary until 1988. During 1991 and 1992, he was the Director of the State Protocol Division. From 1992 to 1995, Mammadyarov worked in the Permanent Mission of Azerbaijan to the United Nations in New York. Upon completion of his duties he returned to Baku and from 1995 to 1998 he was the deputy director of the Department of International Organizations in the Ministry. From 1998 to 2003, he served as counselor at the Embassy of Azerbaijan to the United States. In 2003, Mammadyarov was appointed as Ambassador to Italy.  On 2 April 2004, he was appointed as the Minister of Foreign Affairs. On 9 July 2019, Azerbaijani President Ilham Aliyev signed an order to award him with the Order for service to the Fatherland of the first degree.

Dismissal
He was dismissed in July 2020 after President Aliyev criticized his lack of aggressiveness in responding to the Armenian–Azerbaijani skirmishes. On 16 July, Aliyev conducted an online meeting of the Cabinet of Ministers, where he criticized the Foreign Ministry for being unable to find Mammadyarov in the early stages of the crisis. Stating that while "the Prime Minister is at work, I am at work until the morning, the Minister of Defense, the Chief of General Staff, as well as the Chief of the State Security Service, the Minister of Internal Affairs, the Chief of the Foreign Intelligence Service, and the Secretary of the Security Council are at work until the early hours of the morning", Aliyev asked about the Foreign Minister's whereabouts, to which Prime Minister Ali Asadov replied that Mammadyarov was "working from home". Mammadyarov was dismissed from his position a few hours later. Jeyhun Bayramov was appointed as his successor.

Political activity
During his tenure as foreign minister, Mammadyarov was involved in multiple political activities. Under his position, Azerbaijan took over Chairmanship of the Council of Europe’s Committee of Ministers from Austria for six months in 2014. On June 23, he presented communication to PACE. In his overview, he stressed on combating corruption and manipulation of sports competitions. Elmar Mammadyarov is also chairperson of the National Commission of the Republic of Azerbaijan for UNESCO.

See also
List of foreign ministers in 2017
List of current foreign ministers

References

External links

Ministry of Foreign Affairs of the Republic of Azerbaijan
Mammadyarov meets Chinese delegation
Elmar Mammadyarov: "We are rather speaking of a poll"
Azerbaijan: Armenia Denies Agreeing To Leave Seven Occupied Districts

1960 births
Living people
Azerbaijani Muslims
Diplomatic Academy of the Ministry of Foreign Affairs of the Russian Federation alumni
Ambassadors of Azerbaijan to Italy
Azerbaijan Communist Party (1920) politicians
Diplomats from Baku
Ministers of Foreign Affairs of Azerbaijan
Taras Shevchenko National University of Kyiv alumni